MKL may refer to:

 Math Kernel Library, an Intel software library
 Multiple kernel learning
 FAA Identifier for McKellar-Sipes Regional Airport